The 2000 LPGA Championship was the 46th LPGA Championship, played June 22–25 at DuPont Country Club in Wilmington, Delaware. This was the second of four major championships on the LPGA Tour in 2000.

Defending champion Juli Inkster won her second consecutive LPGA Championship on the second hole of a sudden-death playoff with Stefania Croce, and became the first to successfully defend the title since 

On Saturday, her 40th birthday, Inkster was the 54-hole co-leader with Wendy Ward after a  On a blustery Sunday, she had a three-shot lead with five holes to play, but made a double bogey on 14 and missed a  par putt on the final hole for 75. In the sudden-death playoff, Inkster parred both holes to win the sixth of her seven major titles.

The DuPont Country Club hosted this championship for eleven consecutive seasons, from 1994 through 2004.

Past champions in the field

Made the cut

Source:

Missed the cut

Source:

Final leaderboard
Sunday, June 25, 2000

Source:

Playoff

Sudden-death playoff played on holes 18 and 10.

References

External links
Golf Observer leaderboard
DuPont Country Club

Women's PGA Championship
Golf in Delaware
LPGA Championship
LPGA Championship
LPGA Championship
LPGA Championship
Women's sports in Delaware